The First Colored Baptist Church in Memphis, Tennessee, also known as First Baptist Church—Lauderdale, was built in 1939 in a vernacular Colonial Revival style, with design attributed to Rev. Thomas O. Fuller.

It is a rectangular brick building with brick laid in common bond.  It has a limestone fence separating its parking area from the street, which is a c.1890 fence from the former Second Empire-styled Sanford house on the property.

It was listed on the National Register of Historic Places in 2000.  It was deemed significant for its association with Thomas Oscar Fuller (1867-).

References

External links
First Baptist Church, Lauderdale, official site

Churches in Memphis, Tennessee
Colonial Revival architecture in Tennessee
Churches on the National Register of Historic Places in Tennessee
Baptist churches in Tennessee
Churches completed in 1939
20th-century Baptist churches in the United States
National Register of Historic Places in Memphis, Tennessee
1939 establishments in Tennessee